The Malefice is the debut full-length studio album by Chilean extreme metal band Pentagram Chile. It is their first full-length album released in over 28 years after their formation. The album was released on September 6, 2013. Vice described it as having a "beautifully meaty modern production job, but it pulses with feral old-school energy, giving off a possessed sense of conviction".

The limited edition digipak includes a bonus album with re-recorded demos.

Track listing

Personnel
 Anton Reisenegger – vocals, guitar
 Juan Pablo "Azazel" Uribe – guitar
 Dan Biggin – bass
 Juan Pablo Donoso – drums

References

Pentagram Chile albums
2013 albums